The Wentworth Open Tournament also known as the Wentworth Invitation, and for sponsorship reasons the Wright and Ditson Open Tournament (1885-1888), was a men's tennis tournament played at the Outing Lawn Tennis Club, Hotel Wentworth, New Castle, New Hampshire, United States, on grass courts and also clay courts. 

The first tournament ran from 1884 until 1900, then was abolished. The second tournament was revived in 1953 and ran until 1970.

History
The first edition was played between 30 July and 1 August 1884. From 1893 until 1899 the event was played on clay courts. The first tournament attracted notable players including existing and future major champions, and was staged until 1900. The second tournament was revived in 1953, though it did not feature as many prominent players, which ran till 1970.

Finals

Men's Singles
Incomplete roll

References

Defunct tennis tournaments in the United States
Clay court tennis tournaments
Grass court tennis tournaments